Martín de Rada (Pamplona, Navarre, Spain June 30, 1533 - South China Sea, June 12, 1578; also known as Herrada) was one of the first members of the Order of Saint Augustine (OSA) to evangelize the Philippines, as well as one of the first Christian missionaries to visit Ming China.

Early years
When he was twelve years old, de Rada's parents sent him and his older brother to study at the University of Paris. But conflicts forced his return to Spain, and he enrolled at the University of Salamanca, where he joined the Augustinians. He made his religious profession there on November 21, 1554.

In 1560, he volunteered to work in New Spain (Mexico), a decision he reached while assigned at the Augustinian monastery in Toledo. Alonso de la Vera Cruz, OSA, an educator who established in Mexico the first university in the New World, later wrote that de Rada was "a man of uncommon talent, a good theologian and an eminence in mathematics. ..."

In Mexico, de Rada was assigned to study the Otomi language, and was successfully speaking it after only five months in the area. He went on to write instructional sermons and a book in that language. The talents and administrative abilities of de Rada were noted not only by the Augustinian leaders in Mexico but also by his superiors in Spain.

Voyage to the Philippines
When in 1564 Augustinians were being chosen to accompany Andrés de Urdaneta, OSA, on the royal expedition to the Philippines that was to sail from Mexico under the command of Don Miguel López de Legazpi, his Father Provincial (or regional religious superior) in Spain asked that de Rada should stay in Mexico "until it is known about the success of the armada" (that is, the success  of Legazpi's armed fleet in its attempt to reach and colonize the Philippines).

As it happened, de Rada had already sailed in the Legazpi expedition before the Provincial's letter reached Mexico. The Legazpi expedition reached Cebu in the Philippines on April 27, 1565.

When on June 1, 1565, Urdaneta, accompanied by Andrés de Aguirre, OSA, began his historic return voyage of exploration to Mexico, de Rada remained in the Philippines with Diego de Herrera, OSA, and Pedro de Gamboa, OSA. The trio quickly learned the local Cebuano language.

De Rada remained at Cebu from 1565 to 1572, earning him a place in history as "the apostle of the Christian Faith in Cebu."
In 1566-67, he also made voyages to adjacent islands, mainly Panay, and preached there as well. In 1572 he became the Augustinian regional superior in the Philippines.

While in Cebu, de Rada had begun to study Chinese.  In 1574, he acted as an interpreter to a group of Chinese merchants who visited Manila. He later proposed a plan to conquer China that was never realized.

Legacies

On June 26, 1575 de Rada and Jeronimo Marin, OSA, accompanied a delegation of officials to China. They reached the port of Amoy (Xiamen) in Hokkien province on July 5, and visited a number of cities. The group returned to Manila on October 28, 1575.

De Rada wrote detailed observations on the Chinese people and their way of life. In 1578 de Rada was once again placed on an expedition by the governor of Manila; this was to Borneo, where there was rivalry within the family of the sultan.

The expedition sailed from Manila on March 3, 1578, but was not successful. On the return voyage many people in the expedition got sick. De Rada was one of those less fortunate, and died at sea on the 12th of June shortly before the ship reached Manila. He was only forty-five years of age.

De Rada is much remembered as a great defender of the Filipino people against injustice of Spanish officials at the local level. A key document in this matter was his Parescer del Provincial fray Martin de Rada, agostino, sobre las coasa de estas tieras ("About the abuses committed against the natives in the collection of tributes"), dated at Manila, June 21, 1574.

See also
 Gaspar da Cruz, a Dominican who visited China some years prior to de Rada
 Juan González de Mendoza, whose book (1585) is largely based on de Rada's account of his expedition to China and the materials he had brought from there
Boxer Codex (1590), also based on books brought over by de Rada from China and illustrations of accounts possibly personally instructed by de Rada.

References

Sources
 

Policarpo F. Hernández, OSA, "A Church Built for the Ages Fuses Two Alien Cultures," in Search, The Augustinian Journal of Cultural Excellence (Makati) I (2004), pp. 45–55.
 ; . These two volumes are a reprint of the 1588 English edition, edited by Sir George T. Staunton, Bart.; introduction by Richard Henry Major. Mendoza's work is largely based on de Rada's account of his China trip and on the books he had bought in China.

External links
This article incorporates texts by permission from Augnet: A reference Web site on St. Augustine and the Order of Saint Augustine.

1533 births
1578 deaths
Augustinian friars
Roman Catholic missionaries in the Philippines
16th-century Spanish Roman Catholic priests
Authors of Spanish ethnographic accounts of the Philippines in the 16th century
People of Spanish colonial Philippines
Spanish expatriates in the Philippines
Filipino translators
University of Salamanca alumni
Spanish Roman Catholic missionaries
Missionary linguists